Broad Lane is a hamlet in the civil parish of Carn Brea near Illogan in Cornwall, England, UK. The current Methodist chapel of Broad Lane was built in 1887.

References

Hamlets in Cornwall